Surface of Eceon (or Surface of Eceyon) is an American rock band. Their music has been described as ambient space rock. This unit, which has a penchant for the phantasmagoric, includes members from the psychedelic rock groups, Landing and Yume Bitsu. They released three albums between 2001 and 2007 as well as other recordings.

Current line-up
 Dick Baldwin: guitar
 Adam Forkner: guitar, vocals
 Daron Gardner: bass guitar
 Phil Jenkins: percussion
 Aaron Snow: guitar, synthesizer and vocals

Discography
 The King Beneath the Mountain CD (released via Strange Attractors on November 13, 2001) 
 Dragyyn CD (released via Strange Attractors on June 3, 2003) 
 Crickets and Fireflies CD (split album with Kinski and Paik released by Music Fellowship in 2004)
 Revenge of Dragon LP (released via Music Fellowship in 2007)

References

External links
Surface of Eceon Official site
Epitonic page

American space rock musical groups
American psychedelic rock music groups
American supergroups